The Turf Hotel is a public house in Wrexham, Wales, located on the corner of Wrexham A.F.C.'s Racecourse Ground.

Introduction
For over 150 years, the Turf Hotel has been the meeting place on match days for some of Wrexham's fans (the football ground has existed for over 150 years). It was the only pub in the United Kingdom to be built inside the grounds of a football club and is now the oldest public house at any sport stadium in the world.

Situated on Mold Road, which is now regarded as the ‘Gateway into Wrexham’, the Turf had been in its present position long before the football club was actually founded.

History

The records are unclear, but it is believed that the ‘Turf Tavern’ was built between 1840 and 1844. It was first mentioned in the ‘North Wales Commercial’ (Business Directory) in 1844, which stated that the Landlord was a John Tench. The last North Wales Commercial before that was in 1840, and there was no mention of the Turf then.

The first race meeting at the Racecourse was on 29 September 1807, and later a Grandstand was built next to the Turf, which later became known as the Mold Road stand when the football club was up and running.

Known as the Turf Tavern, its name later changed to the Turf Hotel by 1866. This is believed to have happened when the original building was knocked down and replaced by the current building, however due to the lack of building records, there is no accurate date as to when the Turf Hotel replaced the Turf Tavern.

As well as horse racing, the Racecourse was also being used by this time by Wrexham Cricket Club, and it was from members of the Cricket Club that Wrexham Football Club was formed in 1864. Cricket Club members met at the Turf Hotel on 4 October 1864, for ‘the purpose of starting a football club for the ensuing season.’ This was to give them activities for the winter months.

Not long after, changing rooms were added next to the Turf, for use by both cricketers and footballers. In fact the football pitch at this time lay from north to south, and so it remained until 1902, when it was changed to its present-day orientation of east to west.

The Turf had become a focal point for the local community for the sporting events, and with the growth of football in North Wales, the Racecourse became the home of Welsh football, with international games taking place there, as well as Welsh Cup finals.

The changing rooms were used right up until the late 1940s when new changing rooms were opened under the Plas Coch stand. The changing rooms adjacent to the Turf were situated upstairs, and the teams would climb down a wooden staircase and run out over planks onto the pitch. Also on the same floor were the club offices, which you could enter from Mold Road.

Part of the building adjoining the Turf, where the changing rooms and club office were situated, was demolished when the development of the Pryce Griffiths Stand took place.

The balcony, which is still on the back of the Turf, was a place for locals to watch the many sporting events taking place. There have been other sporting events witnessed from the balcony, including cycling. There once lay a cycling track around the pitch, whilst both boxing and wrestling have taken place on the Racecourse.

In recent years the ground has played host for both Rugby league and Rugby Union World Cup games, whilst up to the late 1960s the Turf itself had its own bowling green where the pub car park is now.

In 2007 the pub was threatened with demolition as part of the revamp of Wrexham AFC's grounds, but Wales First Minister Rhodri Morgan stepped in to support its survival.

The Turf was the starting point of the Olympic Torch Relay when it visited Wrexham on 30 May 2012.

References

External links

 Wrexham County Borough Council
 Local History — Wrexham (BBC)
Wrexham.com
Further archaeological information about Wrexham

Pubs in Wales
Wrexham A.F.C.
Buildings and structures in Wrexham County Borough